The Master Key is a 1945 Universal movie serial, directed by Lewis D. Collins and Ray Taylor. It starred Milburn Stone, Dennis Moore and Byron Foulger. This serial also featured the screen debut of future western film star Lash LaRue.

Plot
Nazi spies, led by the mysterious "Master Key", kidnap Professor Henderson in order to acquire his "Orotron machine" which is capable of extracting gold from sea water.  FBI agent Tom Brant, aided by reporter Janet Lowe and Detective Lt. Jack Ryan, attempt to rescue him and crack the Nazi spy ring.

Cast
 Milburn Stone as FBI Agent Tom Brant
 Jan Wiley as Janet Lowe, a reporter
 Dennis Moore as Detective Lt. Jack Ryan
 Addison Richards as Gerhard Doenitz, alias Garret Donahue, private investigator and Nazi agent
 Byron Foulger as Professor Elwood Henderson
 Maris Wrixon as Dorothy Newton/The Master Key
 Sarah Padden as Aggie
 George Lynn as Herman, the "Spearpoint Heavy" (chief henchman)
 Russell Hicks as Police Chief Michael J. O'Brien
 Roland Varno as Arnold "Hoff" Hoffman, alias M-3
 Lash LaRue as Migsy, a street urchin. This was La Rue's screen debut.
 Jerry Shane as Dan, boys' club member
 Neyle Morrow as Spike, boys' club member
 John Eldredge as Walter Stark, alias M-6

Production

Stunts
Carl Mathews
David Sharpe
Tom Steele
Ken Terrell
Dale Van Sickel

Chapter titles
 Trapped by Flames
 Death Turns the Wheel
 Ticket to Disaster
 Drawbridge Danger
 Runaway Car
 Shot Down
 Death on the Dial
 Bullet Serenade
 On Stage for Murder
 Fatal Masquerade
 Crash Curve
 Lightning Underground
 The Last Key
Source:

See also
 List of film serials
 List of film serials by studio

References

External links

1945 films
American spy films
American black-and-white films
1940s English-language films
Universal Pictures film serials
Films directed by Ray Taylor
Films directed by Lewis D. Collins
American crime films
1945 crime films
Films with screenplays by George H. Plympton
1940s American films